The 1st Regional Community Defense Group, Army Reserve Command is a line unit of the Army Reserve Command of the Philippine Army. It was created for the sole purpose of Reserve Force management, procurement, and organisation in the areas encompassing Northern and Central Luzon.

Training
Training is the major task handled by the 1st Regional Community Defense Group. Its primary arms are the university/college-based Department of Military Science and Tactics-administered mandatory basic and the optional advanced Reserve Officer Training Corps; and the territorial unit-administered Basic Citizen's Military Training.

Basic Reserve Officer Training Corps and Basic Citizen's Military Training graduates are enlisted as privates in the Reserve Force, while advanced Reserve Officer Training Corps graduates are enlisted as sergeants. Completion of Advanced Reserve Officer Training Corps is considered a graduate qualification in military science, and such graduates who subsequently progress to the Probationary Officer Training Course are commissioned as second lieutenants.

Other than time-in-grade and merit promotions, rank adjustments are authorized depending on civilian qualifications, as well as their reciprocity to the operating environment.

Types of reservists
There are currently two types of reservists in the Armed Forces of the Philippines Reserve Force:
 Ready Reservists: physically-fit and tactically-current reservist personnel that are always on constant alert and training; ready to mobilise once a mobilisation order has been given.
 Standby Reservists: reservist personnel who do not maintain currency in specialization qualifications but the base for expansion, support and augmentation to the Ready Reserve Force as needed.

Units
The 1st Regional Community Defense Group has several line units under its command, making the administration and training of reservists more compartmentalized and territorial based.

Base Units
 Headquarters and Headquarters Service Company
 Reserve Officer Training Corps Training Unit
 Citizens Military Training Unit
 Reservist Management Information Systems Office

Line Units
 101st (ILN) Community Defense Center - Camp Valentin Juan, Laoag, Ilocos Norte
 102nd (ILS) Community Defense Center - Camp Elpidio Quirino, Bulag-Bantay, Ilocos Sur
 103rd (LUN) Community Defense Center - Camp J Laberinto, Naguilian, La Union
 104th (PGN-W) Community Defense Center - Isidro Norte, Binmaley, Pangasinan
 105th (PGN-E) Community Defense Center - Camp Lt Tito B Abat, Manaoag, Pangasinan
 106th (BNT) Community Defense Center - Athletic Bowl, Baguio City
 107th (ABR) Community Defense Center - Camp Juan Villamor, Bangued, Abra
 108th (MTP) Community Defense Center - Bontoc, Mountain Province

Reserve Divisions
 16th Infantry Division Ready Reserve (Cp Tito Abat, Manaoag, Pangasinan) 
 17th Infantry Division Ready Reserve (Cp Eldridge, Los Baños, Laguna)
 5th Infantry (Ready Reserve) Division, PA (Cp Elpidio Quirino, Bulag, Bantay, Isabela)
 12th Infantry (Ready Reserve) Division, PA (Cp Juan Villamor, Bangued, Abra)

Awards and decorations

Campaign streamers

Badges

See also
 Philippine Army Reserve Command

References

Citations

Bibliography

 Official Site ARESCOM
 Military Science 21 ROTC Manual, 2001, NCR RCDG, ARESCOM

Military units and formations of the Philippine Army